NGC 3954 is an elliptical galaxy located in the Leo constellation. It was discovered on April 26, 1785 by the astronomer William Herschel.

References

External links 

Leo (constellation)
3954
Elliptical galaxies